Cry Tough is a 1959 crime drama film directed by Paul Stanley written by Harry Kleiner, starring John Saxon and Linda Cristal.

The screenplay of the film is based on the novel of the same name by Irving Shulman. However, in the transition from print to film the Jewish Brooklyn gang of the novel became a Puerto Rican gang in Spanish Harlem.

Cast 

 John Saxon as Miguel Antonio Enrico Francisco Estrada
 Linda Cristal as Sarita
 Joseph Calleia as Sr. Estrada
 Harry Townes as Carlos Mendoza
 Don Gordon as Incho
 Perry Lopez as Toro
 Frank Puglia as Lavandero
 Penny Santon as Señora Estrada

Production
Saxon made it as the first under a three picture deal he had with the Hecht-Hill-Lancaster production company. It was one of several juvenile delinquent-themed movies he made.

References

External links 
 
 
 

1959 films
1959 crime drama films
American crime drama films
1950s English-language films
Film noir
Films produced by Burt Lancaster
Films produced by James Hill
Films produced by Harold Hecht
Films produced by Harry Kleiner
Films with screenplays by Harry Kleiner
Norma Productions films
United Artists films
Films directed by Paul Stanley (director)
1950s American films